The Wexford Intermediate Hurling Championship (known for sponsorship reasons as The Courtyard Ferns Intermediate Hurling Championship) is an annual hurling competition contested by mid-tier Wexford GAA clubs. The Wexford County Board of the Gaelic Athletic Association has organised it since 1930.

The title has been won at least once by 38 different clubs. The all-time record-holders are Ferns St Aidan's, who have won the competition six times.

Oylegate–Glenbrien are the title-holders (2021) defeating HWH Bunclody in the Final.

History

The Wexford Intermediate Hurling Championship dates back to 1930. It was the third championship to be established in Wexford following the Wexford Senior Hurling Championship in 1889 and the Wexford Junior Hurling Championship in 1903. 

No competition was held between 1937 and 1955, owing to its suspension.

The championship was split in two in 2012 with the creation of the new third tier Wexford Intermediate A Hurling Championship.

Cloughbawn defeated HWH Bunclody by 3-17 to 0-14 in the 2019 championship decider replay.

Format

The series of games are played during the summer and autumn months with the county final currently being played at Innovate Wexford Park in October. The championship features a group stage before the top-ranking teams complete a knock-out series of games.

Twelve clubs currently participate in the Wexford Intermediate Championship.

Participating teams

•Buffers Alley

•HWH Bunclody

•Askamore

•Ballygarrett

•Blackwater

•Monageer–Boolavogue

•Oylegate–Glenbrien

•Gusserane O'Rahillys

•St James

•Adamstown

•Rathgarogue–Cushinstown

•Taghmon–Camross

Honours
The Wexford Intermediate Championship is an integral part of the wider Leinster Intermediate Club Hurling Championship. The winners of the Wexford county final join the champions of the other hurling counties to contest the provincial championship. They often do well there with the likes of Ferns St Aidan's and Buffers Alley and Oylegate–Glenbrien among the clubs from Wexford to play in at least one Leinster Championship final after winning the Wexford Intermediate Hurling Championship.

List of finals

Wins listed by club

Records and statistics

Teams

Gaps

Top ten longest gaps between successive championship titles:
 48 years: Buffers Alley (1965-2013)
 40 years: Adamstown (1971-2011)
 36 years: Shamrocks (1960-1996)
 33 years: Oylegate–Glenbrien (1959-1992)
 33 years: Askamore (1976-2009)
 24 years: Fethard St Mogue's (1994-2018)
 22 years: Marshalstown (1983-2005)
 21 years: Ferns St Aidan's (1958-1979)
 20 years: Oylegate–Glenbrien (1992-2012)
 18 years: Geraldine O'Hanrahans (1957-1975)
 18 years: St Anne's, Rathangan (1999-2017)

References

External links
Wexford Intermediate Hurling Championship roll of honour

1
Intermediate hurling county championships
Wexford GAA club championships